The 1996 Indian Federation Cup Final was the 19th final of the Indian Federation Cup, the top knock-out competition in India, and was contested between Kolkata giant East Bengal and Dempo of Goa on 11 August 1996.

East Bengal won the final 2–1 courtesy of a Golden goal by Raman Vijayan in the extra-time to claim their fourth Federation Cup title.

Route to the final

East Bengal

East Bengal entered the 1996 Indian Federation Cup as the runner's up of the tournament's previous edition. In the pre-quarter-final, they faced Air India in their opening match and won 2–1. In the quarter-final, East Bengal faced Border Security Force and in a thriller of a game, won 4–3 in the penalty shootout after the game ended 1–1 after 120 minutes. Raman Vijayan scored the only goal for East Bengal. In the semi-final, East Bengal faced Kerala Police and won the match handsomely by 3–0 with a brace from Vijayan as they reached the final.

Dempo

In the pre-quarter-finals, Dempo faced Delhi Mughals and won it 4–0. In the quarter-final, they faced Kolkata giants Mohun Bagan and after 120 minutes the game ended 0–0 and Dempo won 5–3 via penalty shootout to reach the last four of the tournament. In the Semi-final, they faced the reigning champions JCT Mills; defeated them 3–1 to reach the final.

Match

Details

See also
 19th "Kalyani Black Label" Federation Cup 1996

References

East Bengal Club matches
Dempo SC matches
Indian Federation Cup Finals